Völuspá hin skamma (Old Norse: 'The Short Völuspá) is an Old Norse poem which survives as a handful of stanzas in Hyndluljóð, in the Poetic Edda, and as one stanza in the Gylfaginning section of Snorri Sturluson's Prose Edda. The name of the poem is only known due to Snorri's citation of it in Gylfaginning (chapter 5):

The additional stanzas that remain appear in Hyndluljóð. In his translation of Hyndluljóð, Henry Adams Bellows comments that the preserved fragment of Völuspá hin skamma shows that it was a "late and very inferior imitation of the great Voluspo", and he dates it to the twelfth century. He further suggests that its appearance in Hyndluljóð is due to the blunder of a copyist who confused the two poems, and he does not consider them to be of any great value either as poetry or as mythology.

References

Bibliography

Further reading 

Hyndluljoth, Translation and commentary by Henry Adams Bellows
Völuspá in skamma, Guðni Jónsson's edition with normalized spelling
The Prose Edda, translated by Arthur Gilchrist Brodeur, at sacred-texts.com
Gylfaginning, Old Norse text, Guðni Jónsson's edition.

Eddic poetry
Sources of Norse mythology
Ymir

External Links 
 MyNDIR (My Norse Digital Image repository) illustrations from Victorian and Edwardian  retellings of Voluspa Hin Skamma. Clicking on the thumbnail will give you the full image and information concerning it.